Southern Cone music, includes the music of Argentina, Chile and Uruguay. It comes in many varieties. From the Argentine tango, to the Electro music, from the cuarteto to Rock.

In Argentina the tango is perhaps the most famous music, becoming famous all around the world. Others include the Chacarera, Cueca, Zamba and Chamamé. More modern rhythms include  El Cuarteto, and Electro music. Argentine rock was most popular during the 60s, and still remains Argentina's most popular music. Rock en Español became first popular in Argentina, then it swept through other Latin American countries. That movement is called the "Argentine Wave."

Uruguay has a number of local musical forms. The most distinctive ones are tango and candombe both manifestations  has been recognized by UNESCO as Intangible Cultural Heritage of Humanity.  There is also milonga, a folk guitar and song form deriving from Spanish traditions and related to similar forms found in many Hispanic-American countries. The popular music of Uruguay, which focuses on rock, jazz and many other Western forms, frequently makes reference to the distinctly Uruguayan sounds mentioned above.  The group Los Shakers, 1960s imitators of The Beatles, deserve a special mention as the band that kickstarted the Argentine rock scene. Also, cumbia, a music style popular throughout most of Central and South America is widely enjoyed by the Uruguayan people, particularly in the rural areas.

References